Kupriyanovka is a rural locality (a selo) and the administrative center of Kupriyanovsky Selsoviet of Zavitinsky District, Amur Oblast, Russia. The population was 334 as of 2018. There are 11 streets.

Geography 
Kupriyanovka is located 20 km south of Zavitinsk (the district's administrative centre) by road. Fyodorovka is the nearest rural locality.

References 

Rural localities in Zavitinsky District